Freestyle slalom skating is a highly technical field of roller skating that involves performing tricks around a straight line of equally spaced cones.

Equipment
Most freestyle slalomers use inline skates, although some use quad skates. Those who use inline skates tend to use a full rocker wheel configuration, however there are other variations of the rocker set-up which are used. Some skaters prefer to use a 'full hi-lo' rocker, which means the largest wheel is the second in from the back, with the smallest at the front. A common way to rocker your wheels is by putting larger wheels in the center and smaller wheels on each end. An example of this is having 80 mm wheels in the 2nd and 3rd position and 76 mm in the front and back.  A short frame (230–245 mm) is used to give the skate the maximum possible maneuverability. Inline skates used for slalom have a very tight fit with a strong cuff, to give sustained ankle support. Popular skates used in the past include the FSK skate range by Salomon, now unavailable.

List of slalom moves
The list of basic moves from easiest to hardest. There are many more moves than the ones shown in the list, and many variations on how to complete each move. The names of these moves may differ between countries.

Basic

Forwards Parallel (Fish)
Forwards Monoline (Snake)
Forwards Criss-Cross
Alternating Forwards Cross
Double Cross
Forwards One Foot

Beginner

Backwards Monoline (Snake)
Backwards Criss-Cross
Backwards Parallel (Fish)
Forwards Heel-Toe Snake
Forwards Heel-Toe Criss-Cross
Forwards Toe-Toe Snake
Forwards Heel-Heel Snake
Forwards Shifted Cross
Backwards Shifted Cross
Eagle 
Eagle Cross (Independent)
Eagle Shifted Cross (Wave) 
Eagle Royal 
Eagle Royal Cross  
Reverse Eagle 
Reverse Eagle Criss-Cross 
Reverse Eagle Shifted Cross  
Fake Side-Surf  

 
Intermediate

Crazy
Grapevine (Mabrouk)
Double Crazy
Double Crazy Back  
Forwards Stroll  
Backwards Stroll  
Backwards One Foot  
Chapi Chapo 
X  
X 2   
X Jump (Crab Cross) 
Nelson  
Nelson Back   
Nelson Transfer Back (X-Back)  
Sun
Miniman (Small car 5 Wheels Sitting)
Pendulum  

 
Advanced

Alternating Cross
Crazy Sun    
Mexican    
Italian  
Volte  
Wiper    
Footspin    
Special    
Oliver    
Brush     
Chicken Leg
Cobra
Butterfly

Master

Rocket (Coffee Machine)    
Backwards Rocket  
Christie
Kasatchok  
Toe Wheeling   
Grabbed Toe Wheeling    
Heel Wheeling  
Grabbed Heel Wheeling 
Screw
Leaf
Swan
Deckchair (Corvo)

Instruction
Both the ICP and Skate IA offer slalom instructor certification programs which develop the ability of skaters and coaches in breaking down slalom tricks. They also expand instructors' ability in identifying and solving problems in slalom skating.

Competitions
The World Slalom Series Association (WSSA) organised the first World Championships in inline freestyle in 2008. The competition has been held annually since then and in 2015, World Skate recognized it as an official world championships from the organization, known as the Inline Freestyle World Championship. This competition has been part of the World Skate Games since 2017.

WSSA still organizes all other major calendar competitions in inline freestyle, including the World Cup.

References

External links

Inline Certification Program website
Big Wheel Blading Online Magazine is the source for all things on Big Wheel inline skates
International Freestyle Skaters Association website
World Slalom Skating Association website
WSSA World Slalom Series website
Learn Freestyle slalom skating with kompakombo.com (in french)
Freestyle Slalom Information in Germany

Aggressive skating
Inline skating
Roller skating

it:Pattinaggio freestyle#Style Slalom